Menorah Medical Center is an acute care hospital located in Overland Park, Kansas at 5721 West 119th Street. It is part of the HCA Midwest Division.

History
The Jewish Memorial Hospital Association was established in 1926 by the Jewish community of the Kansas City area with the goal of establishing a Jewish community hospital with a Kosher kitchen in Kansas City, Missouri. On September 7, 1931, the association opened Menorah Hospital (also known as Jewish Memorial Hospital) as a 158-bed hospital at 4949 Rockhill Road, across from the campus of the University of Missouri-Kansas City. The hospital changed its name to Menorah Medical Center in 1951 and merged with Health Midwest in 1993-1994. In 1996, the hospital moved to Overland Park, with the Stowers Institute acquiring the hospital's former site. The hospital was acquired by HCA Healthcare in 2003 as part of their purchase of Health Midwest.

Facilities
The campus includes a doctors' building and outpatient clinics. The services that it feature includes emergency, intensive care, oncology, medical-surgical, labor and delivery, rehabilitation, and extensive outpatient care.

References

External links
 Menorah Medical Center Official Website

Hospitals in Kansas
Buildings and structures in Overland Park, Kansas
HCA Healthcare
Hospital buildings completed in 1931
1931 establishments in Missouri
Jewish medical organizations